Lawless Valley may refer to:
 Lawless Valley (1938 film), an American Western film
 Lawless Valley (1932 film), an American Western film